Solaro may refer to:

Geography
Solaro, Lombardy, municipality in Lombardy, Italy
Solaro, Haute-Corse, commune on Corsica, France
Monte Solaro, a mountain on the island of Capri, Italy
Villanova Solaro a comune (municipality) in the Province of Cuneo in the Italian region Piedmont
Ceriano Laghetto-Solaro railway station railway station in Italy. Located on the Saronno–Seregno railway

People
Solaro (family), medieval bankers
Clemente Solaro, Count La Margherita (1792–1869), Piedmontese statesman
Daniello Solaro ( 1649–1726), Baroque period Italian sculptor active in Genoa and France
Gianni Solaro (1926–2006) Italian film and television actor
Soledad Solaro (born 1978) Argentine model and television personality